State Route 167 (SR 167) is a  east–west state highway in the northeastern portion of the U.S. state of Ohio. The route was designated in 1923, and has been rerouted three times since.

Route description
SR 167 starts at SR 46/307, on the northern edge of Jefferson. The route, known as Beech Street, travels east and crosses a railroad owned by Ashtabula, Carson & Jefferson. SR 167 shifts slightly northeastward, and three miles later, it meets SR 11 at a diamond interchange. Later, the road intersects SR 193 in the middle of Denmark Township. After intersecting Stanhope–Kelloggsville Road, the route moves north a bit, then slowly moves back south and continues eastward. After that, the route starts heading east again, and becomes PA 198 after crossing the Ohio–Pennsylvania state line. The majority of the road is next to farmland. The highest traffic count is in Jefferson, where 2,260 vehicles travel on the road on average. The lowest traffic count is near the state line, where 330 vehicles travel on the road on average.

History
SR 167 was designated in 1923 as a short connector from SR 7 to the Pennsylvania state line east of Richmond Center, an unincorporated village. In 1928, the route was rerouted from Jefferson to the Pennsylvania state line east of Pierpoint. The new western terminus was in SR 46/84 (now SR 307) in Jefferson, and the eastern terminus was the state line, north of Richmond Center. The route became concurrent with US 6 beginning in 1932, between SR 7 and the Pennsylvania state line. In 1939, the highway was rerouted north of its concurrency with US 6, replacing SR 538. In about 1969, SR 11 opened at SR 167 as an at-grade intersection, and seven years later, an interchange replaced the intersection. Between 1979 and 1981, the route was rerouted to the north side of Jefferson to its current alignment.

Major intersections

References

167
Transportation in Ashtabula County, Ohio